Pojejena (Serbian: Пожежена or Požežena) is a commune in Caraș-Severin County, Romania. The commune is located in the geographical area known as Clisura Dunării (Banatska Klisura in Serbian). In 2011, its population numbered 2,585 people, of whom the slight majority are ethnic Serbs. It is composed of five villages: Belobreșca (Белобрешка; Fejérdomb), Divici (Дивић; Divécs), Pojejena, Radimna (Радимна; Rádonya) and Șușca (Шушка; Sisak). Since 2012 the International Pojejena Music Festival takes place there.

Demographics
In 2011, its population was made up of:
 52.14% Serbs
 45.84% Romanians
 1.12% Romani
 others.

Natives
 Slavomir Gvozdenovici

Languages
The commune is officially bilingual, with both Romanian and Serbian being used as working languages on public signage and in administration, education and justice.

Climate
Climate in this area has mild differences between highs and lows, and there is adequate rainfall year-round.  The Köppen Climate Classification subtype for this climate is "Cfb" (Marine West Coast Climate/Oceanic climate).

See also
 Clisura Dunării
 Serbs in Romania

References

Communes in Caraș-Severin County
Localities in Romanian Banat
Romania–Serbia border crossings
Serb communities in Romania
Place names of Slavic origin in Romania